Jabez Coon (1869 – 18 April 1935) was an Australian politician. Born in Maldon, Victoria, he received a primary education before becoming a goldminer and then a boot merchant in Melbourne. In 1906, he was elected to the Australian House of Representatives as the Protectionist member for the new seat of Batman. He held the seat until his defeat in 1910 by a Labor candidate. He was a member of the City of Collingwood council, and mayor from 1909 to 1910. He is the father-in-law of Gilbert Chandler, member of the Victorian Legislative Council and Minister for Agriculture in the Bolte Ministry from 1955 to 1973.

On 18 April 1935, Coon collapsed and died suddenly at South Yarra whilst returning home to Boronia.

References

1869 births
1935 deaths
Protectionist Party members of the Parliament of Australia
Commonwealth Liberal Party members of the Parliament of Australia
Members of the Australian House of Representatives for Batman
Members of the Australian House of Representatives
Victoria (Australia) local councillors
Mayors of places in Victoria (Australia)
20th-century Australian politicians